Michael Leslie Ogilvy Faber (12 August 1929 – 26 February 2015) was a professor at the University of Sussex and a key adviser to the Zambian government for whom he negotiated favourable terms for the transfer of mineral rights formerly held by the British South Africa Company.

References

1929 births
2015 deaths
Academics of the University of Sussex
People educated at Eton College
Alumni of Magdalen College, Oxford
British economists